Gubernatorial elections in 1996 took place in 51 regions of the Russian Federation. President of Tatarstan Mintimer Shaymiyev as well as mayors of Moscow and Saint Petersburg Yury Luzhkov and Anatoly Sobchak (all three elected in 1991) went to the re-election, while other regions held their first gubernatorial elections that year. All these campaigns were held after the 1996 Russian presidential election.

Background 
In August 1996, two coalitions were presented, which formally became the main participants in the countrywides election campaign. Our Home – Russia, Democratic Choice of Russia, Party of Russian Unity and Accord and 16 other parties and movements loyal to re-elected Boris Yeltsin were united through representation in the All-Russian Coordination Council (OKS). It was opposed by the People's Patriotic Union of Russia (NPSR) associated with the Communist Party of the Russian Federation and its allies. Former Kremlin Chief of Staff Sergei Filatov was appointed the head of OKS, while NPSR was headed by Gennady Zyuganov, leader of CPRF.

NPSR initially announced the lists of approved candidates publicly and centrally, but by the end of the campaign it gave a significant part of the initiative to the localities. In some cases, the support was unilateral (without public commitment of the candidate). Among the candidates supported by NPSR were three incumbent governors, and in three regions the alliance observed neutrality. OKS supported mainly the incumbent governors. As a result of the autumn-winter electoral marathon, 22 out of 49 running incumbents re-elected. The second tours in Mari El and Tyumen Oblast moved to 1997, as well as recall elections in Amur Oblast, Agin-Buryat and Evenk Autonomous Okrugs.

Results

Notes

References

Sources 

Gubernatorial elections in Russia
1996 elections in Russia